Arnica louiseana is a Canadian species of flowering plant in the family Asteraceae, known by the common name Lake Louise arnica or snow arnica. It is native to the Canadian Rockies in Alberta and British Columbia, and named for Lake Louise in Banff National Park.

Arnica louiseana is a small plant rarely more than 20 cm (8 inches) tall. Flower heads are yellow, with both ray florets and disc florets. It grows at high elevations in alpine tundra and rocky outcrops.

References

louiseana
Flora of Western Canada
Plants described in 1906
Endemic flora of Canada
Flora without expected TNC conservation status